Justyna Kasprzycka-Pyra (born 20 August 1987 in Głubczyce) is a Polish athlete specializing in the high jump. She finished fifth at the 2013 World Championships in Athletics.

Her personal bests in the event are 1.99 metres outdoors (Eugene 2014) and 1.97 metres indoors (Sopot 2014).

Competition record

References

Polish female high jumpers
1987 births
Living people
People from Głubczyce
Sportspeople from Opole Voivodeship
Competitors at the 2013 Summer Universiade